Euphrasia Eluvathingal (born Rosa Eluvathingal; 17 October 1877 – 29 August 1952) was an Indian Carmelite nun of the Syro-Malabar Church, which is an Eastern Catholic Church in Kerala. Euphrasia is said to have had a vision of the Holy Family, at which point the illness she had long felt ceased. She was canonised as a saint by Pope Francis on 23 November 2014 in Vatican City. Since the beheading of St. John the Baptist is celebrated on August 29, the feast of St. Euphrasia is postponed to August 30.

Early life
She was born Rosa Eluvathingal on 17 October 1877 in a Syro-Malabar Catholic Nasrani family in Kattoor, Irinjalakuda, Thrissur district, in Kerala.

Religious life

She endeavoured to lead a life of constant prayer and of devotion to the Sacred Heart of Jesus, becoming known to many people as the Praying Mother.

Miracles
The first reported miracle was curing a carpenter from bone cancer. Thomas Tharakan from Anchery in Ollur, a furniture polishing worker, was diagnosed with cancer by the Jubilee Mission Medical College and Research Institute in Thrissur. Thomas was admitted to the hospital for one week. Later before the surgery, a scan by the doctor showed no sign of tumour, despite an earlier scan report showing clear evidence of a tumour. Thomas's sister, Rosy, later claimed that cure was the result of her prayer to Euphrasia.

The second reported miracle happened to a seven-year-old child named Jewel from Aloor in Thrissur District. The child had a tumour in his neck which made it difficult for him to swallow any food. Doctors at Dhanya Hospital in Potta, Thrissur District, had said that this disease was incurable. As Jewel's family came from a poor background, their only option was to pray for divine intercession. After his grandmother prayed to Euphrasia, doctors noticed that his tumour began to shrink. Dr Sasikumar of Dhanya Hospital examined him once again and found the tumour to have disappeared. Many other doctors examined the boy and stated that there was no medical basis for this event.

Stages of canonisation

Servant of God
On 27 September 1986 the process of canonisation began in Ollur. On 13 August 1987 Father Lucas Vithuvatikal was appointed as Postulator. He made the oath as Postulator in the presence of Mar Joseph Kundukulam, the Metropolitan Archbishop of Thrissur on 29 August 1987 and Euphrasia was declared a "Servant of God" on the same day.

Venerable
Sister Perigrin was appointed as Vice-Postulator on 9 September 1987 and in 1988 a Diocesan Tribunal for the Cause of Euphrasia was established by Kundukulam, established an apostolic miracle on 8 January 1989. and concluded its work on 19 June 1991. On 30 January 1990 the tomb of Euphrasia was opened and her remains were transferred to a newly built tomb inside the chapel of St. Mary's Convent. Her case was submitted to the Congregation for the Causes of Saints, Rome, on 20 April 1994, and on 5 July 2002 Pope John Paul II declared her "Venerable".

Blessed
She was beatified on 3 December 2006 in St. Anthony's Forane Church, Ollur, with the declaration of the Major Archbishop, Varkey Vithayathil, on behalf of Pope Benedict XVI. Apostolic Nuncio to India Archbishop Pedro López Quintana and Archbishop Jacob Thoomkuzhy of the Syro-Malabar Catholic Archeparchy of Thrissur joined 30 prelates and 500 priests for the beatification events.

Saint
On 3 April 2014, Pope Francis authorised the Congregation for the Causes of Saints to promulgate the decrees concerning the miracle attributed to Euphrasia's intercession. This confirmed the Pope's approval of Euphrasia's canonisation. At a special Mass held at St Peter's Square at Vatican City on 23 November 2014, Pope Francis canonised Euphrasia as a saint. Mother Sancta, Mother General of Congregation of the Mother of Carmel (CMC), carried the relics of Euphrasia to the altar.

See also
 Saint Euphrasia Eluvathingal, patron saint archive

References

Further reading
 Garhika Sabhayude Pravachika (Malayalam) by Mother Mariam
 Sr. Pastor, CMC, Athmadaham (Malayalam): The spirituality of the Servant of God Mother Euphrasia (Thrissur : 1998)
 Sr. Leo, CMC, (Trans), Servant of God Mother Euphrasia (Kolazhy, Thrissur: 1998)
 Mgr. Thomas Moothedan, A Short Life of Sr. Mariam Thresia (Mannuthy: 1977)
 Fr. J. Ephrem, C.R., The Praying Mother. Trans. C.A. Regina (Kolazhy, Thrissur: 1999)
 Dr. Sr. Cleopatra, CMC: The twin roses of Trichur: The servants of god Mariam Thresia and Euphrasia

1877 births
1952 deaths
Carmelite saints
Third Order Carmelites
Malayali people
Christian clergy from Thrissur
Christianity in Kerala
Archdiocese of Thrissur
Discalced Carmelite nuns
20th-century Eastern Catholic nuns
Canonizations by Pope Francis
Syro-Malabar saints
Beatifications by Pope Benedict XVI
Venerated Catholics by Pope John Paul II
Christian female saints of the Late Modern era

20th-century Indian women
20th-century Indian people
Women from Kerala
Venerated Catholics from Kerala
Women educators from Kerala
Educators from Kerala
People from Irinjalakuda
Indian Eastern Catholic nuns